The Heroic Quest of the Valiant Prince Ivandoe is an animated miniseries created by Eva Lee Wallberg and Christian Bøving-Andersen for Cartoon Network. It began airing on Cartoon Network in Denmark, Finland, Iceland, Norway, and Sweden on November 20, 2017.  The series is the second to be produced by Cartoon Network Studios Europe (now Hanna-Barbera Studios Europe). It is a parody of the 1820 British novel Ivanhoe by Sir Walter Scott. The show takes on a style very reminiscent of Studios Europe's earlier cartoon, The Amazing World of Gumball, featuring animation created with a variety of different sources.

On June 15, 2020, it was announced that Cartoon Network has ordered a long-form series. It will consist of 40 11-minute episodes. The series made its premiere at the Annecy Festival on June 14, 2022. The series will air on Cartoon Network and HBO Max in early 2023. Although, various international feeds have already started to air the series, starting with Italy which premiered it on December 5, 2022, Latin America and Asia on February 4, 2023, and Canada premiering it on April 1, 2023.

Plot
The series follows the adventures of Ivandoe (voiced by Rasmus Hardiker), the young prince of the forest whose father, The Mighty Stag, sends him on a quest for the magical Golden Feather of the fearsome Eagle King. Ivandoe and his dedicated squire, a small bird named Bert (also voiced by Hardiker), discover new and mysterious areas of the forest and an array of peculiar creatures along the way.

Cast and characters
 Rasmus Hardiker as Prince Ivandoe, Bert, Princess Syllabob, and Puffer Fish Maids 
 Hugo Harrison as Frogman 
 Steve Furst as Cupcake the Poodle 
 Alex Jordan as Prince Svan, Rodent, and Gnomes 
 Dustin Demri-Burns as Gnomes 
 Christian Bøving-Andersen as Gnomes 
 Brian Blessed as Mountain 
 Kerry Howard as Creature and Troll Woman 
 Rob Rackstraw as King Axalotyl and Princess Syllabob 
 Laura Aikman as Jezebel and Poe

Shorts

Episodes

Broadcast
Broadcast of the series began in January 2018 throughout Central and Eastern Europe on the Cartoon Network, including Germany, Italy, Portugal, Poland, on Boing (Spain), and in February 2018 in France and Sub-Saharan Africa. In the United Kingdom, episodes premiere exclusively on the feed's YouTube channel. It aired in Latin America and Brazil on July 5, 2018.

References

External links
 

2010s British animated television series
2010s British comedy television series
2017 Danish television series debuts
2017 Danish television series endings
British children's animated adventure television series
British children's animated comedy television series
British flash animated television series
Danish children's animated adventure television series
Danish children's animated comedy television series
English-language television shows
Cartoon Network original programming
Television shows based on Ivanhoe
Television series by Hanna-Barbera Studios Europe